Le Croisic is a commune in the Loire-Atlantique department, western France. It is part of the urban area of Saint-Nazaire.

History
The United States Navy established a naval air station on 27 November 1917 to operate seaplanes during World War I. The base closed shortly after the First Armistice at Compiègne. The writer and historian Auguste Lorieux (1796–1842) was born in Le Croisic.

However, in the March 1942 St Nazaire Raid, a British Commando team on the obsolete  and several motor launch boats were able to slip by the Le Croisic radar station and ram Campbeltown into the Normandie dry dock gate, before sabotaging other vital parts to the dry dock. Delayed action explosives on Campbeltown went off several hours after the night raid, destroying the dry dock gate and putting it out of commission until after WWII was over, with France liberated and Nazi Germany having surrendered to the Allied Powers/United Nations.

Legend
In a medieval French legend recounted during the funeral of Anne of Brittany in 1514, Le Croisic was the scene of a story which explained the origin of the use of ermine in heraldry. In the story, Anne's supposed ancestor Innogen, the daughter of Greek king Pandrasus and wife of Brutus of Troy from Geoffrey of Monmouth's pseudo-history Historia Regum Britanniae, was attending a hunt at Le Croisic, when a stoat being pursued by Brutus' dogs took refuge with her.

Population

See also
La Baule - Guérande Peninsula
Communes of the Loire-Atlantique department
Ferdinand du Puigaudeau

References

Communes of Loire-Atlantique